Wajir is the capital of the Wajir County of Kenya. It is situated in the former North Eastern Province.

History
A cluster of cairns near Wajir are generally ascribed by the local inhabitants to the Maadiinle, a semi-legendary people of high stature, who are associated with the Somali. A. T. Curle (1933) reported the excavation of two of these large tumuli, finding traces of skeletal remains which crumbled at his touch, as well as earthenware shards and a copper ring.

Wajir was attacked by Italian forces in World War II.

The infamous Wagalla massacre is one of the greatest transitional justice issues in Kenya today committed by government in 1984 in the Wajir. The army rounded up Somali men of the Degodia clan from their homes in the wee hours of the morning of 10 February and held them up at the local airstrip for four days without water and food.The security men opened fire at them and their bullet-ridden bodies scattered across the airstrip and in its bushy environs.

Overview
Wajir is located in an arid area prone to drought. (Latitude:1.75000; Longitude:40.05000). The town is served by Wajir Airport, with flights to Nairobi, Galkacyo and Mogadishu.

Demographics
Wajir is mainly inhabited by Somalis, The 2019 census reported a total population of 90,116 inhabitants.

Climate
Wajir has a hot arid climate (Köppen BWh).

Administrative divisions

Wajir is the capital of the Wajir County. The county is subdivided into 6 Constituencies (Wajir South Constituency, 
Wajir East Constituency, Wajir West Constituency, Wajir North Constituency,Tarbaj Constituency and Eldas Constituency. These constituencies are represented by Members of Parliament in the National Assembly. The county has a total of 30 wards.

See also
 Wajir Airport
 Wajir County
 List of airports in Kenya

References

External links
Location of Wajir At Google Maps
wajir county news website

Populated places in Wajir County
County capitals in Kenya